Reiji Oyama may refer to:
Reiji Oyama (pastor)
Reiji Oyama, a character of the game Power Instinct